In Greek mythology, the name Chloris (from ) also called Meliboea, was one of Niobe and Amphion's fourteen children (the Niobids). She was often confused with another Chloris, daughter of another Amphion, who became the wife of Neleus of Pylos.

Mythology 
Meliboea was the only one (or one of two) spared when Artemis and Apollo killed the Niobids in retribution for Niobe's insult to their mother Leto, bragging that she had many children and Leto had only two. Meliboea was so frightened by the ordeal, she turned permanently pale, changing her name to Chloris ("pale one"). Pausanias mentioned a statue of Chloris near the sanctuary of Leto in Argos. In another version, she is a daughter of Teiresias.

Notes

References 

 Gaius Julius Hyginus, Fabulae from The Myths of Hyginus translated and edited by Mary Grant. University of Kansas Publications in Humanistic Studies. Online version at the Topos Text Project.
 John Tzetzes, Book of Histories, Book II-IV translated by Gary Berkowitz from the original Greek of T. Kiessling's edition of 1826.  Online version at theio.com
 Pausanias, Description of Greece with an English Translation by W.H.S. Jones, Litt.D., and H.A. Ormerod, M.A., in 4 Volumes. Cambridge, MA, Harvard University Press; London, William Heinemann Ltd. 1918. Online version at the Perseus Digital Library
 Pausanias, Graeciae Descriptio. 3 vols. Leipzig, Teubner. 1903.  Greek text available at the Perseus Digital Library.
 Pseudo-Apollodorus, The Library with an English Translation by Sir James George Frazer, F.B.A., F.R.S. in 2 Volumes, Cambridge, MA, Harvard University Press; London, William Heinemann Ltd. 1921. Online version at the Perseus Digital Library. Greek text available from the same website.

Niobids
Princesses in Greek mythology

Theban characters in Greek mythology